Elie Salem (born 1930) is a Lebanese academic and politician. He served as the deputy prime minister and minister of foreign affairs between 1982 and 1984. He was the president of the University of Balamand.

Early life and education
Salem was born in Btourram on 5 March 1930. He graduated from American University of Beirut in 1950 obtaining a degree in political science. Then he attended an American university.

Career and activities
Salem worked as an academic at his alma mater and was the dean of the Faculty of Arts and Sciences until 1982 when he was named as the minister of foreign and expatriate affairs, and also as deputy prime minister. He served in the posts until 1984 during the presidency of Amine Gemayel. Salem was a confidant of the President which allowed him to initiate the decision-making process at the ministry.

Following the end of his term as foreign minister Salem founded the Institute for Policy Studies in Lebanon. In addition, he was among the advisers of President Amin Gemayel. He also taught at the School for Advanced International Studies at Johns Hopkins University. As of 2016, Salem served as the president of University of Balamand.

Personal life
Salem met his wife in the US during his studies there, and they married in 1954. One of their children, Paul Salem, is the president of the Middle East Institute in Washington, D.C. His daughter, Lucy, is married to Karim Al Rasi who is the son of the Lebanese politician Abdullah Al Rasi.

Work
Salem has published various articles and books, including Prospects for a new Lebanon.

References

External links

1930 births
Living people
Deputy prime ministers of Lebanon
Foreign ministers of Lebanon
American University of Beirut alumni
Academic staff of the American University of Beirut
Academic staff of the University of Balamand
Lebanese political scientists
20th-century Lebanese writers
Presidents of universities in Lebanon
People from Koura District